Kaptai may refer to places in Bangladesh:

 Kaptai Upazila
 Kaptai Cantonment
 Kaptai Dam
 Kaptai Lake